USS Mann or USNS Mann may refer to various United States Navy ships, including:

, a tug and patrol vessel in commission from 1917 to 1919
, a troop transport in commission from 1943 to 1965
, a cargo ship in non-commissioned service with the Military Sea Transportation Service from 1950 to 1958

Mann, USS